ArGo Airways was a regional airline based in Volos, Greece.

History

Destinations
ArGo Airways operated the following services (as of February 2010):

Athens - Athens International Airport
Skiathos - Skiathos Island National Airport
Thessaloniki - Thessaloniki International Airport, "Macedonia"
Volos - Nea Anchialos National Airport

Fleet
The ArGo Airways fleet included the following aircraft (as of 20 February 2010):

1 de Havilland Canada DHC-3 Otter

References

External links

Defunct airlines of Greece
Airlines established in 2009
Airlines disestablished in 2010
Companies based in Volos
Greek companies established in 2009